Ernest Womersley ( 28 August 1932 - 15 September 2018) was a former professional footballer, who played for Huddersfield Town. He was born in Hartshead, West Yorkshire.

References

1932 births
2018 deaths
English footballers
People from Hartshead
Association football defenders
English Football League players
Huddersfield Town A.F.C. players
Bradford City A.F.C. players